The United States Nordic Combined Championships 2011 took place on August 1, 2010 in Park City, Utah. Brett Camerota won the race.

Results

References 
 Results on the U.S. Ski Team's website.

2011 in American sports
2011 in Nordic combined
United States Nordic Combined Championships
2011 in sports in Utah